Robert Förstemann (born 5 March 1986) is a German track cyclist specialising in the sprint disciplines and world champion in team sprint in 2010. In his later career he has transitioned to Paralympic track cycling, representing Germany as a sighted 'pilot' in tandem events at the 2020 Summer Paralympics.

Major results

Olympics 2012
The German Olympic team used a loophole in the International Cycling Union (UCI) regulations to include Förstemann as an additional member of their 2012 sprint cycling team. He was also included in the German team for the mountain bike event.

Physique
In July 2012, a photograph of Förstemann's legs was widely circulated by the world's media during the 2012 Summer Olympics. Described as a 'quad off' with Olympic team-mate André Greipel, the photo showed his quad muscles compared with those of the road cyclist. A circumference of  has also been recorded, and the size of his quad muscles has led to him being called "Quadzilla" by some in his sport.

References

External links

 
 
 
 
 
  

1986 births
Living people
German male cyclists
German track cyclists
UCI Track Cycling World Champions (men)
Olympic cyclists of Germany
Olympic bronze medalists for Germany
Olympic medalists in cycling
Cyclists at the 2012 Summer Olympics
Medalists at the 2012 Summer Olympics
Cyclists at the 2020 Summer Paralympics
Cyclists from Thuringia
People from Greiz
21st-century German people